Punk is the second studio album by American rapper Young Thug. It was released on October 15, 2021, through YSL Records and is distributed by Atlantic Records and 300 Entertainment. The album contains guest appearances from Strick, J. Cole, T-Shyne, Gunna, Future, BSlime, Juice Wrld, Post Malone, ASAP Rocky, Lil Double 0, Drake, Travis Scott, Doja Cat, Nate Ruess, Jeff Bhasker, and Mac Miller. The production on the album was handled by a variety of record producers, including T-Minus, Metro Boomin, Kanye West, Pi'erre Bourne, Wheezy, Oz, Louis Bell, and Watt, among others. 

The album received generally positive reviews from music critics and was a commercial success. It debuted at number one on the US Billboard 200 chart, earning 90,000 album-equivalent units in its first week.

Background and release
In an interview about recording his debut studio album, So Much Fun (2019), Young Thug told The Fader that he wanted to release a follow-up album in the "upcoming weeks". In contrast to his debut, which he described as a "lighthearted work", Punk would be more personal and introspective. He implied that the new album was "touching" and interpreted the meaning of Punk as "brave, not self centered, conscious, very, very neglected, very misunderstood, very patient, very authentic". He said the album would reflect "real rap".

On July 27, 2021, Thug featured on an NPR Tiny Desk home concert, where he performed four new songs and teased an October 15 release date for the album, as seen on the back of his t-shirt. More promotion for Punk is a video published on October 13, 2021, of Thug smashing a $320,000 Rolls-Royce with the word "punk" painted on it in pink.

Following Punk’s release, Thug stated during his appearance on The Breakfast Club that his track "Day Before" with Mac Miller was recorded on the day before Miller's death on September 7, 2018.

Critical reception

Punk was met with generally positive reviews. At Metacritic, which assigns a normalized rating out of 100 to reviews from professional publications, the album received an average score of 78, based on six reviews.

Kyann-Sian Williams of NME praised the album, stating, "Featuring a masterpiece of a collaboration with the late, great Mac Miller, this hugely inventive second studio album proves Thugger's all-time greatness". Paul A. Thompson from Pitchfork enjoyed the album, saying, "While Young Thug's creative choices after about 2015 have had little sway over emerging trends, Punk suggests that the space he now occupies is one that allows him more room to experiment". Robin Murray of Clash said, "Impactful and often unexpected, PUNK breaks new ground within Young Thug's identity". Rolling Stone critic Jeff Ihaza said, "With his latest album, you get the feeling that these are songs Thug needed to get off of his chest. While not a dazzling record, it opens a door to exciting opportunities". Reviewing the album for AllMusic, Fred Thomas stated, "Punk is relatively odd for an album that debuted at number one on the charts, sneaking some of Young Thug's inherent eccentricity in among its more commercially viable moments".

Armon Sadler of HipHopDX said, "With Punk, Thugger continues to expand his game to the point of reaching true limitlessness; he's like a young, athletic slasher in basketball who expands his repertoire to become well-rounded and achieve longevity in the sport". In a lukewarm review, The Line of Best Fits Leo Culp wrote, "Punk will likely not be remembered as a great Young Thug album, but we should appreciate that we get to hear him tinker with his sound for when he finally puts it all together again". Writing for The Arts Desk, Harry Thorfinn-George stated, "There are countless rappers who use a similar melodic flow, but none that can so effortlessly find hidden melodies in every beat".

Year-end lists

Commercial performance
Punk debuted at number one on the US Billboard 200 chart, earning 90,000 album-equivalent units (including 12,000 copies in pure album sales) in its first week. This became Thug's third US number one debut on the chart. The album also accumulated a total of 102 million on-demand streams of the album's songs. In its second week, the album dropped to number seven on the chart, earning an additional 34,000 units.

In South Africa, nine songs from the album debuted within the top 100  on The Official Charts South Africa (TOSAC), in the week ending October 28, 2021. This became a new record on the chart.

Track listing

Charts

Weekly charts

Year-end charts

References

2021 albums
Young Thug albums
YSL Records albums
Albums produced by T-Minus (record producer)
Albums produced by Metro Boomin
Albums produced by Kanye West
Albums produced by Pi'erre Bourne
Albums produced by Wheezy
Albums produced by Cardo (record producer)
Albums produced by Louis Bell
Albums produced by Andrew Watt (record producer)